Dhund is a Pakistani television mystery drama series aired on TV One, written by Syed Mohammad Ahmed and directed by Farrukh Faiz. Each episode of the series featured a new cast except Maria Wasti, Hassan Ahmed, Fahad Rehmani and Syed Mohammad Ahmed who appeared in all episodes.

Plot overview
The series revolves around a brave woman who can encounter dead people and helps spirits to find them peace.

Cast

Main
 Maria Wasti as Maria
 Syed Mohammad Ahmed as Nana Syed
 Hassan Ahmed
 Fahad Rehmani as Kashif

References

Pakistani drama television series